Abdellah Bidane (born 19 August 1967), also known as Abdellah Bidar, is a former Moroccan football defender who played for Morocco in the 1986 FIFA World Cup. He also played for CODM Meknès.

References

External links
FIFA profile

1967 births
Moroccan footballers
Morocco international footballers
Association football defenders
1986 FIFA World Cup players
Living people
COD Meknès players
Botola players